The 1925 PGA Championship was the eighth PGA Championship, held September 21–26 at Olympia Fields Country Club in Olympia Fields, Illinois, a suburb south of Chicago. Then a match play championship, defending champion Walter Hagen defeated Bill Mehlhorn 6 & 5 in the finals on Courses 3 & 4 to win his second consecutive PGA Championship, his third overall, and the seventh of his eleven major titles.

The victory ran Hagen's match record at the PGA Championship in the 1920s to 20–1, falling only to Gene Sarazen in 38 holes in the 1923 finals. With his second  consecutive title, his winning streak stood at ten matches. This was the second of four consecutive PGA Championships for Hagen; through 2013, no other player was won more than two consecutive titles.

Hagen had close calls in this event; his first round match with low qualifier Al Watrous went to 39 holes and the quarterfinal match with future two-time champion Leo Diegel went to 40 holes after Diegel built an early lead. Hagen defeated Diegel the following year in the finals, then Diegel beat Hagen on the way to his two titles in 1928 and 1929.

The four 18-hole courses at Olympia Fields were reduced to two in the 1940s when the club sold half of its property. Course No. 4 became the North course, and the South course is a composite of holes form the other three.

Format
The match play format at the PGA Championship in 1925 called for 12 rounds (216 holes) in six days:
 Monday – 36-hole stroke play qualifier
top 32 professionals advanced to match play
 Tuesday – first round – 36 holes 
 Wednesday – second round – 36 holes 
 Thursday – quarterfinals – 36 holes 
 Friday – semifinals – 36 holes 
 Saturday – final – 36 holes

Final results
Saturday, September 26, 1925

Final eight bracket

References

External links
PGA Media Guide 2012
PGA.com  – 1925 PGA Championship

PGA Championship
Golf in Illinois
PGA Championship
PGA Championship
PGA Championship
PGA Championship